Rachel Findlay (born circa 1750 – died after August 17, 1820) (also spelled "Finley" or "Findley") was a Native American mixed race woman who was illegally enslaved for over fifty years and twice sued the Commonwealth of Virginia for her rightful freedom, successfully winning her case in 1820.

Life 
Rachel Findlay was born into slavery in the early 1750s in Virginia, in the area now known as Powhatan County.

Her mother was possibly of both Indian and African ancestry, and her maternal grandmother was named Chance, an illegally enslaved Indian woman from either the Catawba or Choctaw nation.

Freedom lawsuits 
In the early 1770s, Findlay and her brother sued their owner Thomas Clay (the great-grandfather of politician Henry Clay) on the ground that they were illegally enslaved (the colony of Virginia had formally ended the legal practice of Indian slavery in 1705). Being a descendant of a Native American was one of the few circumstances under which enslaved Black persons could sue to be emancipated during this period.

In May 1773, the General Court of Virginia in Williamsburg ruled that Findlay and her brother were free, but before the court reached its verdict, the Clay family had preemptively sent Findlay and her daughter west and sold them to another slave owner, John Draper near Ingles Ferry. Findlay and her daughter were enslaved by the Draper family in Wythe County, Virginia for forty years. 

In 1813 Rachel again filed suit, this time in the Wythe County courts, to obtain her freedom. The case was eventually transferred to Powhatan County and became a jury trial. Rachel's legal counsel faced the challenge of convincing the jury of twelve white men of Rachel's rightful freedom.

Rachel formally won her freedom on May 13, 1820 and was granted one penny in damages. Because of Virginia law, when Rachel received her freedom, all of her children, grandchildren, and great-grandchildren also became legally entitled to freedom (approximately forty-four persons in total).

Death 
Little is recorded about Rachel's life after the case, but she is believed to have died after August 17, 1820.

Legacy and honors 
The 2002 novel, Free in Chains, is a historical fiction account of Findlay's life and fight for her freedom.

In 2014, Rachel was posthumously honored as a Virginia Women in History inductee. One of her descendants, Robert Fitzgerald, accepted the award on her behalf saying, “Her life reflects the human spirit’s need to be free and at all costs.”

References 

1750s births
1820s deaths
18th-century Native American women
19th-century Native American women
Women in Virginia
19th-century American slaves
18th-century American slaves